Olav Kjelbotn (5 October 1898, Fosnes – 17 May 1966, Namsos) was a Norwegian cross-country skier who competed in the late 1920s. He won a bronze medal at the 1926 FIS Nordic World Ski Championships in the 50 km event.

Kjelbotn also finished fourth in the 50 km event at the 1928 Winter Olympics in St. Moritz.

Cross-country skiing results
All results are sourced from the International Ski Federation (FIS).

Olympic Games

World Championships
 1 medal – (1 bronze)

References

External links

Norwegian male cross-country skiers
1898 births
1966 deaths
FIS Nordic World Ski Championships medalists in cross-country skiing
People from Fosnes
Cross-country skiers at the 1928 Winter Olympics
Olympic cross-country skiers of Norway
Sportspeople from Trøndelag